Claudio Raoul Vittorio Lippi (July 7, 1970 in Vimercate, Italy – March 26, 2013 in Buccinasco, Italy) was an Italian sports journalist and TV presenter of Milan Channel who died at 42 years old in a motorcycle accident.

Milan and Inter have played a special match in his memory in Milan. Milan has given his name, Claudio Lippi, to the press room at the Milanello Sports Centre.

References

1970 births
2013 deaths
Italian journalists
Italian male journalists
People from Brianza
People from Vimercate